All bacteria require the use of three initiation factors: IF1, and IF2, for translation. Some phyla require an additional IF3.

IF1 

Bacterial initiation factor 1 associates with the 30S ribosomal subunit in the A site and prevents an aminoacyl-tRNA from entering. It modulates IF2 binding to the ribosome by increasing its affinity. It may also prevent the 50S subunit from binding, stopping the formation of the 70S subunit. It also contains a β-domain fold common for nucleic acid binding proteins. It is a homolog of eIF1A.

IF2 

Bacterial initiation factor 2 binds to an initiator tRNA and controls the entry of that tRNA into the ribosome.  IF2, bound to GTP, binds to the 30S P site. After associating with the 30S subunit, fMet-tRNAf binds to the IF2 then IF2 transfers the tRNA into the partial P site. When the 50S subunit joins, it hydrolyzes GTP to GDP and Pi, causing a conformational change in the IF2 that causes IF2 to release and allow the 70S subunit to form. It is a homolog of eIF5B.

IF3 

Bacterial initiation factor 3 (infC) is not universally found in all bacterial species but in E. coli it is required for the 30S subunit to bind to the initiation site in mRNA. In addition, it has several other jobs including stabilization of free 30S subunits, facilitation of 30S subunits binding to mRNA and checking for accuracy against the first aminoacyl-tRNA. It also allows for rapid codon-anticodon pairing for the initiator tRNA to bind quickly to. IF3 is required by the small subunit to form initiation complexes, but has to be released to allow the 50S subunit to bind.

External links
 

Molecular biology
Protein biosynthesis
Gene expression